Bezirk Leoben is a district of the state of Styria in Austria.

Municipalities
Towns (Städte) are indicated in boldface; market towns (Marktgemeinden) in italics; suburbs, hamlets and other subdivisions of a municipality are indicated in small characters.
 Eisenerz
 Hieflau
 Jassingau
 Kalwang
 Pisching, Schattenberg, Sonnberg
 Kammern im Liesingtal
 Dirnsdorf, Glarsdorf, Leims, Liesing, Mochl, Mötschendorf, Pfaffendorf, Seiz, Sparsbach, Wolfgruben
 Kraubath an der Mur
 Kraubathgraben, Leising
 Leoben
 Donawitz, Göß, Hinterberg, Judendorf, Leitendorf, Seegraben
 Mautern in Steiermark
 Eselberg, Liesingau, Magdwiesen, Rannach, Reitingau
 Niklasdorf
 Proleb
 Kletschach, Köllach, Prentgraben
 Radmer
 Radmer an der Hasel, Radmer an der Stube
 Sankt Michael in Obersteiermark
 Brunn, Greith, Hinterlainsach, Jassing, Liesingtal, Vorderlainsach
 Sankt Peter-Freienstein
 Hessenberg, Tollinggraben, Traidersberg
 Sankt Stefan ob Leoben
 Kaisersberg, Lichtensteinerberg, Lobming, Niederdorf, Zmöllach
 Traboch
 Madstein, Stadlhof, Timmersdorf
 Trofaiach
 Edling, Gai, Gausendorf, Gimplach, Gößgraben, Hafning bei Trofaiach, Krumpen, Kurzheim, Laintal, Oberdorf, Putzenberg, Rötz, Schardorf, Töllach, Treffning, Untergimplach, Unterkurzheim, Windischbühel
 Vordernberg
 Wald am Schoberpaß
 Liesing, Melling

References 

 
Districts of Styria